The perineal raphe is a visible line or ridge of tissue on the body that extends from the anus through the perineum to scrotum (male) or labia majora (female). It is found in both males and females, arises from the fusion of the urogenital folds, and is visible running medial through anteroposterior, to the anus where it resolves in a small knot of skin of varying size.

In males, this structure continues through the midline of the scrotum (scrotal raphe) and upwards through the posterior midline aspect of the penis (penile raphe). It also exists deeper through the scrotum where it is called the scrotal septum.  It is the result of a fetal developmental phenomenon whereby the scrotum and penis close toward the midline and fuse.

See also 
 Raphe
 Linea nigra
 Embryonic and prenatal development of the male reproductive system in humans
 Frenulum of prepuce of penis

Images

References 

Scrotum